Amar-Sin (: DAmarDSîn, after the Moon God Sîn", the "𒀭" being a silent honorific for "Divine"), initially misread as Bur-Sin (c. 2046-2037 BC middle chronology, or possibly ca. 1982–1973 BC short chronology) was the third ruler of the Ur III Dynasty. He succeeded his father Shulgi (c. 2030–1982 BC). His name translates to 'bull calf of the moon-god'.

Reign
Year-names are known for all nine years of his reign. These record campaigns conducted against Urbilum, and several other regions with obscure names: Shashrum, Shurudhum, Bitum-Rabium, Jabru, and Huhnuri. Amar-Sin is otherwise known to have campaigned against Elamite rulers such as Arwilukpi of Marhashi, and the Ur Empire under his reign extended as far as the northern provinces of Lullubi and Hamazi, with their own governors. He also ruled over Assur through the Akkadian governor Zariqum, as confirmed by his monumental inscription.

Amar-Sin's reign is notable for his attempt at regenerating the ancient sites of Sumer. He apparently worked on the unfinished ziggurat at Eridu. 

The Babylonian Weidner Chronicle records the following: "Amar-Sin... changed the offerings of large oxen and sheep of the Akitu festival in Esagila. It was foretold that he would die from goring by an ox, but he died from the [scorpion?] 'bite' of his shoe."

Attempted Coup
The administrative documentation from Amar-Sin's reign suggests that in his final years, he was confronted with some internal strife, and it is likely that his brother, Shu-Sin, was behind an effort to ovethrow him. The imperial guard, the agà-ús, were replaced in Amar-Sin's seventh year with a unit called the gàr-du, often the gàr-du of Amar-Sin. This unit disappears from the record in his ninth year shortly after his death. Also in his seventh year, the king hosted military officials from throughout the empire at a banquet in Ur, where they were required to swear an oath of loyalty. Cylinder seals bearing dedications to the king Shu-Sin appear towards the end of Amar-Suen's reign, but certainly before his death. The provincial governors also see some unusual transitions during this time, including being ousted during the middle of Amar-Sin's reign, only to return to their post after his death. Taken together, it seems likely that Shu-Sin attempted to take power during his brother's reign. It is unclear if Amar-Sin was assassinated during this period, or if he died of natural causes.

Year names of Amar-Sin
All the year names of Amar-Sin are known, and, as was standard for the time, document events during that king's reign. While some events are military conquests, most of Amar-Sin's years record cultic activities. Some examples include:

Artifacts

See also

Correspondence of the Kings of Ur
Mashkan-shapir

Notes

References

|-

Sumerian kings
21st-century BC Sumerian kings
20th-century BC Sumerian kings
Third Dynasty of Ur